Rep. Carter Bassett Harrison (1756 – April 18, 1808) was a politician from the U.S. state of Virginia. He was a son of Benjamin Harrison V, a member of the Continental Congress and signer of the American Declaration of Independence, and an older brother of William Henry Harrison, the ninth President of the United States.

Harrison was born at the Berkeley Plantation in Charles City County, Virginia and was attending the College of William & Mary 1776, and maybe other years. He is listed as leaving the college to join the American Army during the Revolution. He was a member of the Virginia House of Delegates, 1784–1786 and 1805–1808. He was elected to the U.S. House of Representatives for the Third Congress and to the two succeeding Congresses, serving from March 4, 1793 to March 3, 1799. Harrison died in Prince George County, Virginia. On January 15, 1787, in Surry County, Carter married Mary Howell Allen of "Claremont" on the James, and had three children: William Allen, Benjamin Carter and Anna Carter (Harrison) Adams. Rep. Harrison's second wife was Jane Byrd, who died ca. 1813. There were no children by this union. Carter's burial is unknown, however, it is likely he's buried at his old plantation, "Maycox," in Prince George County.

Letter from Carter Bassett Harrison to James Madison

Maycox April 4, 1801

Dear Sir, This will be presented by Mr. Alexander Kerr, a friend of mine, who is disposed to fill some federal office that may be vacant in the town of Alexandria. I have been, for some time, acquainted with Mr. Kerr. I have ever found him a gentleman of capacity, integrity & the man of business. These requisites added to his republican character may fit him for any appointment that the president may think proper to bestow on him. Present me most respectfully to Mrs. Madison & assure yourself of my confidence in your office & esteem I am your obedient servant.

Public Speaking at the College of William & Mary

Spoke at the public annual exercises in Williamsburg on July 4, 1796. Bachelor of Arts degree given at this time. This was in the Virginia Gazette and General Advertiser, Richmond, VA. Wed. July 13, 1796.

Carter B. Harrison's years in office

Virginia House of Delegates: Representing Surry County from May 3, 1784 - June 30, 1784

Virginia House of Delegates: Representing Surry County from October 18, 1784 - January 7, 1785

Virginia House of Delegates: Representing Surry County from October 17, 1785 - January 21, 1786

United States House of Representatives: Carter was elected to the U. S. Congress from March 4, 1793 - March 3, 1799. These would be the third, fourth & fifth Congress.

Virginia House of Delegates: Representing Prince George County from December 2, 1805 - February 6, 1806

Virginia House of Delegates: Representing Prince George County from December 1, 1806 - January 22, 1807

Virginia House of Delegates: Representing Prince George County from December 7, 1807 - February 10, 1808

Altogether, Carter spent at least eleven years in elected office. He was called a "distinguished member of the House of Delegates."

- The General Assembly of Virginia July 30, 1619 – January 11, 1978: a Bicentennial Register of Members, by Cynthia Miller Leonard

Sources

1756 births
1808 deaths
Members of the Virginia House of Delegates
Carter Bassett
American people of English descent
American planters
People from Charles City County, Virginia
College of William & Mary alumni
Democratic-Republican Party members of the United States House of Representatives from Virginia